Afke Helprigdina Maria Schaart (born 24 October 1973, Zwartsluis) is a former Dutch politician and manager. As a member of the People's Party for Freedom and Democracy (Volkspartij voor Vrijheid en Democratie) she was an MP from June 17, 2010, to September 19, 2012. She focused on matters of economic affairs (technology, innovation, export, regional and business location policy) and top incomes policy.

From 2008 to 2010 she was a member of the municipal council of Wassenaar.

Schaart studied political science with a specialization in international relations at the University of Amsterdam.

References 
  Parlement.com biography

External links 
  Afke Schaart personal website
  People's Party for Freedom and Democracy website

1973 births
Living people
Dutch political scientists
Dutch public relations people
Members of the House of Representatives (Netherlands)
Municipal councillors of Wassenaar
People from Wassenaar
People from Zwartewaterland
People's Party for Freedom and Democracy politicians
University of Amsterdam alumni
Women political scientists
21st-century Dutch politicians
21st-century Dutch women politicians